Jagadish Timmanagouda Patil is an Indian Politician from the state of Karnataka. He was a Three term member of the Karnataka Legislative Assembly.

Constituency
He represented Bilagi constituency.

Political Party
He is from the Indian National Congress.

References 

Living people
Indian National Congress politicians from Karnataka
Year of birth missing (living people)
Karnataka MLAs 1994–1999
Karnataka MLAs 1999–2004
Karnataka MLAs 2013–2018